Dominic Jones (born January 18, 1987) is a former American football defensive back. He played college football at the University of Minnesota before being dismissed from the program and transferring to Otterbein College. He attended Brookhaven High School in Columbus, Ohio.

Early years
Born the son of Keith Jones and DaMona Lipsey, Jones played high school football for the Brookhaven High School Bearcats. As a senior in 2004, Jones helped lead the Bearcats to an Ohio Division II State Championship. Jones received scholarship offers from Michigan State, Minnesota and Pittsburgh.

College career

University of Minnesota
Jones chose to continue his football career for the University of Minnesota. Jones saw playing immediately for the Gophers, appearing in all 12 games as a true freshman. He was 6th on the team with 55 tackles on the season, while also leading the team in punt return yards. As a sophomore in 2006, Jones was the starting strong safety for the Golden Gophers, starting at 13 games. He tied for second on the team with 82 tackles, while also serving as the team's primary kickoff and punt returner.

Sexual assault conviction
In July 2007, Jones was charged. He was acquitted of the rape charge against 21 year old Katherine Iannito and eventually convicted of criminal sexual conduct. In July 2009, an appeals court upheld Jones' conviction, but reduced his four year prison sentence, which was even higher than the usual recommended guidelines the felony, to time he already served.

Otterbein College
After serving one year in a Hennepin County workhouse, Jones enrolled at Otterbein College, where he was given a chance to join the football program. Jones earned first team All-America, All-Region, and All-Ohio Athletic Conference in his lone season with the Cardinals.

Professional career

Cleveland Gladiators
Jones was assigned to the Cleveland Gladiators on October 20, 2011.

Orlando Predators
Jones signed with the Orlando Predators on November 5, 2012. He returned 88 kicks for 1,751 yards and four touchdowns during the 2013 season, earning Second Team All-Arena honors as a kick returner.

Return to Gladiators
Jones was traded to the Cleveland Gladiators on February 18, 2014.

Coaching career
Jones was named the defensive backs coach of the Cleveland Gladiators on March 3, 2016. In December 2016, he was promoted to assistant head coach and director of football operations.

References

External links
Just Sports Stats

Living people
1987 births
Players of American football from Columbus, Ohio
American football defensive backs
Minnesota Golden Gophers football players
Otterbein Cardinals football players
Cleveland Gladiators players
Orlando Predators players
Cleveland Gladiators coaches
Sportspeople from Columbus, Ohio